Rossella Biscotti (born 1978) is an Italian visual artist best known for her installations, performances and video.

Early life and education 
She graduated from the Accademia di Belle Arti in Naples in 2002, she attended the Rijksakademie van Beeldende Kunsten in Amsterdam in 2010–2011. Back in 2000 she was selected for the Advanced Course in Visual Art at the Fondazione Antonio Ratti in Como. The visiting professor was Ilya Kabakov.

Career 
Rossella Biscotti focuses on social and political events which sometimes have happened in the distant past and become the starting point for the investigation of individual or collective identity and memory.

Her methodology is based on a meticulous preliminary research into archival materials such as found documents, audio recordings or newspapers documenting stories and events which have been forgotten by history. She uses archive materials to underline the loss of information, the ambiguity of reconstructions and their possible uses as well. Biscotti is interested in the potentiality of new narrations when they start circulating again through her artworks.

With Le Teste in Oggetto (The Heads in Question, 2009) the artist analyzes the relations between art and power raising questions about the status of contemporary artists and their degree of intellectual and conceptual autonomy. The sculpture consists of the heads of King Victor Emmanuel III of Italy and Benito Mussolini, which were found by the artist in the storerooms of the Palazzo degli Uffici in the EUR district in Rome. The sculptures were created for the Esposizione universale (1942) which never took place because of Italy's involvement in World War II. Biscotti decided to appropriate them and exposed them to the public for the first time. Doing so, the artist radically reversed their original meaning: rather than celebratory monuments, they became the focus of reflection and discussion.

In her work Il Processo (The Trial, 2010–12) she focuses on the April 7th trial (1983–84), against the members of Autonomia Operaia. The trial was held in the Aula Bunker in Rome, a high-security courthouse, which hosted the most important trials of the period known as Anni di Piombo (Years of Lead). She created an installation composed by concrete sculptures made from casts of the architectural features of the courtroom, taken before their demolition. The installation is accompanied by a six-hour audio edited recording of the April 7 trial. Defendants in the court case included the philosophers Antonio Negri and Paolo Virno, and other intellectuals accused of being ideologically and morally responsible for Italian terrorism developed in the late 1970s. Il Processo won the MAXXI prize in 2010, promoted by MAXXI – Museo nazionale delle arti del XXI secolo in Rome.

The human condition and circumstances in detention are the focus of I dreamt that you changed into a cat...gatto...ha ha ha (2013). Rossella Biscotti developed her research in the women's prison on Giudecca island at the Venetian lagoon. This prison is not like a traditional one where inmates are locked and unproductive; on the contrary, the prisoners spend their time working outside the prison. As all prison cells are open, Biscotti was given the opportunity to meet every prisoner by creating a dream workshop, called ‘oneiric laboratory’. Using the workshop as a platform to communicate with the prisoners, Biscotti analyzed the institution and the way the inmates figure in it. She processed her research in a sculpture made of compost, which was the result of work that has been done by inmates in the kitchen, cleaning, the growing of vegetables and consumption. The work was presented during the 55th Venice Biennale in 2013.

Exhibitions 
Her work has been exhibited widely throughout Italy and abroad, in major museums and galleries.

Solo exhibitions 
 2015 Rossella Biscotti, The future can only be for ghosts, Museion, Bolzano (IT).
 2014 Rossella Biscotti, 10 x 10, Mies van der Rohe Stipend, Museum Haus Esters, Krefeld (DE).
 2014 Rossella Biscotti: The Undercover Man, Sculpture Center, Long Island City, New York (US).
 2014 Rossella Biscotti: For the Mnemonist, S., Wiels, Brussels (BE).
 2013 The Trial, e-flux, New York (US).
 2013 The Side Room, Wiener Secession, Vienna (AT).
 2012 Title One: The tasks of the Community, CAC, Vilnius (LT).
 2012 L'Isola, De Vleeshal, Middelburg (NL).
 2011 Il Processo (The Trial), RijksakademieOpen, Rijksakademie van Beeldende Kunsten, Amsterdam (NL).
 2010 168 sections of a human brain, Galleria Civica di Trento (IT).
 2009 A short story about memory, pentothal and dreams, Kunstlerhaus Bethanien, Berlin (DE).
 2009 After four rotations of A, B and C will make one revolution (with Kevin van Braak), Samsa, Berlin (DE).
 2009 Le Teste in Oggetto, Nomas Foundation Rome (IT).
 2008 The Undercover Man, Wilfried Lentz Rotterdam (NL).
 2008 You Have to Be Focused, Prometeo Gallery, Lucca (IT).
 2008 New Crossroads (with Kevin van Braak), Galleria Studio la Citta’, Verona (IT).
 2008 The Sun Shines in Kiev, Italian Academy at Columbia University, New York (US).
 2005 L’Italia è una repubblica democratica fondata sul lavoro, Galerie Paolo Boselli, Brussels (BE).
 2002 Rossella Biscotti, Galleria T293, Naples (IT).

Awards 

In 2013 she was recipient of the Mies van der Rohe Stipend. In 2010 she won the Premio Michelangelo at Post Monument, XIV International Sculpture Biennale of Carrara (IT), and the Premio Italia Arte Contemporanea 2010. In 2009 she won the Premio Fondazione Ettore Fico, Artissima Art Fair, Turin (IT), the 2nd Prize Prix de Rome, Amsterdam (NL) and the Emerging Talents Award, Strozzina Foundation, Florence (IT). In 2008 she was recipient of 1st Prize Golden Cow at Gstaadfilm Festival, Gstaad (CH). In 2007 she was awarded with the 1st Prize The City of Geneva Grand Prize at the 12th Biennial of Moving Images, at the Centre pour l’image contemporaine, Geneva (CH). In 2006 she won the Premio NY promoted by Italian Ministry of Foreign Affairs in collaboration with the Italian Academy and the Columbia University in New York (US).

References

1978 births
Living people
Italian video artists
Italian contemporary artists
21st-century Italian women artists